Giang Văn Minh (1573 - 1638) was a Vietnamese officer of Revival Lê dynasty.

Biography
Giang Văn Minh has the courtesy name Quốc Hoa (國華), posthumous name Sir Văn Trung (文忠先生). He was born on 6 September 1573 in the village of Đường Lâm near Sơn Tây. In 1637, he was sent as an envoy to the Chinese Ming court by emperor Lê Thần Tông.

Family
 Parents: Giang Văn Tâm (father)
 Wife: Đỗ Thị
 Children: 2 sons (Giang Văn Trạch, Giang Văn Tôn) and 7 daughters

References

 Life of Sir Giang Văn Minh
 Chùa Hoa Nghiêm và bài bi văn của ông Thám hoa Giang Văn Minh
 A village whose presence lingers in the heart

1573 births
1638 deaths
People from Hanoi
Lê dynasty officials